Joseph Edgar Fillingane (born January 10, 1973) is an American politician who has served in the Mississippi State Senate from the 41st district since 2006. He previously served in the Mississippi House of Representatives from the 101st district from 2000 to 2006.

References

1973 births
Living people
Republican Party members of the Mississippi House of Representatives
Republican Party Mississippi state senators
21st-century American politicians